The Marwari Muslims or Marwadi Muslims are an Indian and Pakistani ethnic group that originate from the Rajasthan region of India. Their language, also called Marwari, is a dialect of Rajasthani and is a part of the western group of Indo-Aryan languages.

See also
Islam in India

References

External links
 Jodhpur Muslims Build a Future for Themselves

Islam in India by location
Social groups of Pakistan

Marwar